Justine Baltazar (born February 19, 1997) is a Filipino professional basketball player for the Pampanga G Lanterns of the Pilipinas Super League. He is listed at 6 feet 9 ½ inches (2.07 m).

Early life and education
Baltazar was born on February 19, 1997 in Mabalacat, Pampanga. He moved to Metro Manila in 2012 to attend the Nazareth School of National University. In college, he attended De La Salle University.

High school and college career
Baltazar played in the University Athletic Association of the Philippines (UAAP) in high school and college. In the juniors' (high school) division he played for the Nazareth School of National University Bullpups. Baltazar led the team to a runner-up finish in UAAP Season 77 in 2015 and to the title in UAAP Season 78 in 2016. He later transferred to De La Salle University to play for the De La Salle Green Archers, also of the UAAP, for college.

Professional career
Baltazar entered the PBA Season 47 draft but later withdrew after an offer from a team from the Japanese B.League. He would later make his professional debut with his hometown team Pampanga Delta of the NBL–Philippines playing a game on the same day as the PBA draft. He played for Pampanga before in the 2019–20 season, when the NBL–Philippines was still an amateur league.

In May 2022, Baltazar signed with the Hiroshima Dragonflies of the B.League for the 2022–23 season. He is set to join the team after the conclusion of his stint with the Delta in the 2022 NBL–Philippines season. However, he was released on December 20, 2022.

National team career
Baltazar has played for the Philippine national team. He suited up for the national team in the 2022 FIBA Asia Cup qualifiers and the 2020 FIBA Olympic Qualifying Tournament both in mid-2021.

Personal life
Baltazar is married to Rizza with whom he has a son.

References

1997 births
Living people
Basketball players from Pampanga
De La Salle Green Archers basketball players
Filipino expatriate basketball people in Japan
Filipino men's basketball players
Hiroshima Dragonflies players
Maharlika Pilipinas Basketball League players
People from Mabalacat
Philippines men's national basketball team players
Power forwards (basketball)